William Blount Carter (October 22, 1792 – April 17, 1848) was an American politician who represented Tennessee's first district in the United States House of Representatives.

Biography
Carter was born in Elizabethton, Tennessee on October 22, 1792. He attended the public schools and served as a colonel in the United States Army during the War of 1812.

Career
Carter served as a member of the Tennessee House of Representatives and he served in the Tennessee Senate. He was a delegate to the State constitutional convention in 1834 and served as its presiding officer. 

Carter was elected as an Anti-Jacksonian to the Twenty-fourth United States Congress and as a Whig to the Twenty-fifth and Twenty-sixth Congresses. He served as a U.S. Representative from March 4, 1835 to March 3, 1841. He owned slaves.

Death
Carter died in Elizabethton, Tennessee on April 17, 1848 (age 55 years, 178 days). He is interred at the Carter Cemetery at Elizabethton.

Family

Carter was an uncle of General Samuel P. Carter and Congressman Nathaniel Green Taylor.  Another nephew, also named William Blount Carter (1820–1902), was a prominent Southern Unionist and mastermind of the East Tennessee bridge burnings during the Civil War.

References

External links 

1792 births
1848 deaths
People from Elizabethton, Tennessee
National Republican Party members of the United States House of Representatives from Tennessee
Whig Party members of the United States House of Representatives from Tennessee
Members of the Tennessee House of Representatives
Tennessee state senators
American slave owners
United States Army officers
Military personnel from Tennessee
United States Army personnel of the War of 1812